Melichrus urceolatus, commonly known as urn heath or honey-gland heath, is a species of flowering plants in the family Ericaceae. The species is native to Queensland, New South Wales and Victoria in Australia. It is an erect shrub that grows to between 0.2 and 1.5 metres in height. The white, cream or yellow-green flowers, are clustered toward the branch bases and appear between March and November in the species' native range.

The species was first formally described by botanist Robert Brown in 1810 in Prodromus Florae Novae Hollandiae.

Ecology 
It grows in dry sclerophyll forest, woodland and scrub on skeletal and gravelly soils.
Associated tree species in Victoria include Eucalyptus macrorhyncha, E. microcarpa and E.polyanthemos.

References

Further reading
 Albrecht, D.E. (1996). Epacridaceae. In: Walsh, N.G.; Entwisle, T.J. (eds), Flora of Victoria Vol. 3, Dicotyledons Winteraceae to Myrtaceae. Inkata Press, Melbourne.

Epacridoideae
Ericales of Australia
Flora of New South Wales
Flora of Queensland
Flora of Victoria (Australia)
Plants described in 1810